Mořice is a municipality and village in Prostějov District in the Olomouc Region of the Czech Republic. It has about 500 inhabitants.

Notable people
Jaroslav Vítek (1915–1966), athlete

References

Villages in Prostějov District